Michael Farthofer (born 8 June 1955) is a sailor from Austria, who represented his country at the 1984 Summer Olympics in Los Angeles, United States as helmsman in the Soling. With crew members Christian Holler and Richard Holler they took the 15th place.

References

Living people
1955 births
Sailors at the 1984 Summer Olympics – Soling
Olympic sailors of Austria
Sportspeople from Vancouver
European Champions Soling
Austrian male sailors (sport)